36 Crazyfists were an American metalcore band formed in Anchorage, Alaska in 1994. The band's name comes from the Hong Kong martial arts film 36 Crazy Fists (1977) starring Jackie Chan. To date they have released eight studio albums.

History

Early years (1994–1999)
36 Crazyfists formed in 1994 in Anchorage, Alaska. The original members were vocalist Brock Lindow, guitarists Steve Holt and Ryan Brownell, bassist JD Stuart, and drummer Thomas Noonan. Holt is from Kenai, and Lindow spent much of his childhood there. Lindow, Brownell, Stuart, and Noonan are all from Anchorage.

36CF originated from the remains of three local bands: Grin, Hessian, and Broke. JD Stuart played in Grin, Brock Lindow in Hessian, and Steve Holt and Ryan Brownell in Broke. One of the circumstances influencing the formation of 36CF was the murder of Broke's drummer Duane Monsen. On January 28, 1994, Broke played a set at the Underground bar in Anchorage. Later that night there was an altercation between Monsen and a drunken soldier who was stationed locally at Ft. Richardson. According to an article in the Anchorage Daily News, Monsen tried to apologize and defuse the situation, but was fatally stabbed in the neck. He was 27 years old. In the wake of this tragedy, Monsen's friends organized a benefit concert to raise funds for his family. Monsen's protégé Thomas Noonan played the drums at this show and the musicians decided that they were an excellent match. Since that time the members have considered it the de facto first 36CF performance.

36CF released their first EP, Boss Buckle, in 1995 on cassette. At that time the band's local popularity was rising quickly and the tape became a rarity, with the entire printing sold or given away as promos. On May 13, 1996, 36CF opened for Primus at Egan Center in Anchorage. This concert was particularly interesting in a few ways. This was the one of the first times 36CF performed before an audience of thousands, though many locals were already familiar with the band's music. This was also the last show of Primus' Punchbowl tour and the last show for drummer Tim Alexander before his first hiatus from Primus.

36CF were planning to relocate to Tacoma, Washington, in search of professional recording contracts when another tragedy struck. On June 16, 1996, JD Stuart died in a car collision at age 23. This was a huge loss for the band because Stuart's musicianship and showmanship were a large part of the band's appeal. Nevertheless, the band persevered. At that time, Brownell retired from the band and the remaining members recruited bassist Mick Whitney, who is also from Anchorage. 36CF then relocated to the Seattle-Tacoma metropolitan area.

In 1997, the band released their second EP, Suffer Tree, on cassette. Later that year they self-published full-length demo CD, In the Skin. They next relocated to Portland, Oregon. In 1999, they released a four-song demo that, through their friends in Skinlab, ended up in the hands of Monte Conner, A&R rep at Roadrunner Records. In an interview with AntiHero Magazine, vocalist Brock Lindow states that the demo was produced by Steev Esquivel and Scott Sargeant of Skinlab.

Roadrunner Records years (2000–2007)
Signed by Roadrunner Records in 2000, the band recorded their major debut album Bitterness the Star which was released on April 4, 2002. In support of its release they toured with bands such as Candiria, God Forbid, Chimaira, Diecast, and Hotwire. After touring the United States, they headed off to Europe to begin the European Road Rage Tour with Killswitch Engage and Five Pointe O.

The band re-emerged two years later, on March 16, 2004 with their second album A Snow Capped Romance which was produced by James Paul Wisner (who also produced albums for bands like Dashboard Confessional and As Friends Rust). They toured intensely behind the record (playing shows with acts like Killswitch Engage and Poison the Well) through December, taking two months off before beginning the work on their next album.

36 Crazyfists entered the studio with producer Sal Villanueva (who had worked with Thursday and Taking Back Sunday) in October 2005 to commence recording their third album Rest Inside the Flames, which was released across Europe on June 12, 2006. Ultimately, Roadrunner decided not to release the album in North America. A deal with DRT Entertainment was later struck, and the album received a belated release on November 7, 2006.

The album was a success in the UK, with Rest Inside the Flames debuting at No. 71 on the UK Albums Chart, and reaching No. 2 on the BBC's Rock Albums chart. However, the album only sold 1,858 copies in the US during its first week of release.

The band started an extensive UK tour, supported by Twelve Tribes and Your Rigamortus on April 1, 2007, where they played at 26 venues across the country.

Ferret Music years (2007–2014)

In May 2008 the band released The Tide and Its Takers on Ferret Music. They continue to play annually at the Summer Meltdown Festival in Anchorage, Alaska, except for 2008, when they were on tour with the first Annual Rockstar Mayhem Festival. Shortly after the Mayhem tour, bassist Mick Whitney left the band and was replaced by Brett Makowski.

36 Crazyfists filmed their show of January 9, 2009 in Anchorage, Alaska for their first live DVD, Underneath a Northern Sky, released in October 2009.

The album Collisions and Castaways was released in the US by Ferret Music on July 27, 2010 and a day earlier in the rest of the world via Roadrunner Records. The album features guest appearances by Twelve Tribes frontman Adam Jackson (who also featured on their 2008 album The Tide and Its Takers), Raithon Clay of Plans to Make Perfect, and Brandon Davis from Across the Sun.  Production duties for the album were handled by band guitarist Steve Holt and sport mixing from Andy Sneap.

The band played a variety of European festivals in June, including the UK Download Festival. 36 Crazyfists returned to the US in July to tour with Fear Factory, After the Burial, Divine Heresy, and Baptized in Blood.

In the UK the band re-signed with Roadrunner Records. Collisions and Castaways was released a day earlier on July 26.

Time and Trauma, Lanterns and lineup changes (2014–2021)
In May 2011, 36 Crazyfists confirmed they would be touring the UK starting on October 1 in Oxford and finishing the nine date tour in Birmingham on October 22. The tour was subsequently canceled due to family matters. 36 Crazyfists did, however, confirm that they have begun writing their next album. In 2012 the band announced the addition of drummer Kyle Baltus to the group's ranks after the departure of long time drummer, Thomas Noonan. In addition, the band was rejoined by bassist Mick Whitney following the departure of Brett "Buzzard" Makowski.

During the UK tour at the end of 2013, the band debuted the title track for their seventh studio album, Time and Trauma. By mid-2014 the band had completed work on their new album for an early 2015 release. A listening party for the CD was held on July 24 at Pioneer Bar in Anchorage. Their seventh studio album Time and Trauma was released on February 17, 2015 via Spinefarm Records. Spinefarm Records also released the single "Also Am I" on their SoundCloud page.

On September 29, 2017, the band released their eighth studio album Lanterns on Spinefarm Records.

On March 19, 2021, Steven Holt posted on his personal Facebook profile in which he suggested that the band has disbanded. However, there has been no official confirmation, and less than two weeks prior, vocalist Brock Lindow confirmed that a new album was about half written. However, a few weeks later, it was reported that the band was continuing without Lindow, though there was also no official confirmation.

Musical style
36 Crazyfists has been described as nu metal earlier in their musical career, metalcore, alternative metal, and post-hardcore. According to Adam Rees of Metal Hammer, 36 Crazyfists occupies "a territory between jarring metalcore, nu metal's groove and the anthemic charge of post-hardcore".

Band members
Final Lineup

Brock Lindow – lead vocals 
Steve Holt – guitars, backing vocals 
Mick Whitney – bass 
Kyle Baltus – drums 

Former members
JD Stuart – bass 
Ryan Brownell – guitars 
Thomas Noonan – drums 
Brett "Buzzard" Makowski – bass

Timeline

Discography

Studio albums

EPs

Singles

Other releases
 2002: "Follow" featuring Brock Lindow and Kyle Novak on vocals). Song by Family Tree on the album Family Tree 1 released on Excessive Use of the Force Records. Family Tree also features David Holt, brother of Steve Holt, on guitar synth and touch guitar.
 2003: "At the End of August" – featured in MTV2's Headbangers Ball
 2003: "Racecar" by Delmag featuring Brock Lindow. Delmag is the band of former 36CF guitarist Ryan Brownell.
 2004: "Beauty Through the Eyes of a Predator" by Demon Hunter featuring Brock Lindow, on their album Summer of Darkness
 2004: "Bloodwork" – featured in Resident Evil: Apocalypse Soundtrack
 2004: "Workhorse" (Cast Iron Hike cover) – featured on Jäger Music Rarities Promotional Giveaway
 2005: "Fall Away" featuring Brock Lindow, Sarah Pederson and Kyle Novak on vocals and "Drawing Contact" featuring Brock Lindow and Sarah Pederson on vocals – Both songs by Family Tree on the album Family Tree 2 released on Excessive Use of the Force Records. Family Tree also features David Holt, brother of Steve Holt, on drums, guitar synth and touch guitar
 2005: Destroy the Map EP – released in connection with their 2005 April tour in the UK and Europe. Also includes "Workhorse" and "Sad Lisa" covers
 2006: "I'll Go Until My Heart Stops" – featured in MTV2 Headbanger's Ball: The Revenge
 2006: "Digging the Grave" (Faith No More cover) – featured on Kerrang! High Voltage and the iTunes version of Rest Inside the Flames
 2010: "It Only Gets Harder from Here" by Witness the End featuring Brock Lindow on their self-titled EP
 2011: "This Is My Nightmare" by Heart Attack High featuring Brock Lindow on their album The Honeymoon Is Over
 2019: "Voids" by Distance Defined featuring Brock Lindow on their album "Hollow Hearts"

Videography
 "Slit Wrist Theory" – Bitterness the Star
 "At the End of August" – A Snow Capped Romance
 "Bloodwork" – A Snow Capped Romance
 "I'll Go Until My Heart Stops" – Rest Inside the Flames
 "We Gave It Hell" – The Tide and Its Takers
 "Reviver" – Collisions and Castaways
 "Also Am I" – Time and Trauma
 "Swing the Noose" – Time and Trauma
 "Death Eater" - Lanterns
 "Better to Burn" - Lanterns
 "Wars to Walk Away From" - Lanterns
 "Kenai Lanterns Tour" - Lanterns
 "Sleepsick" - Lanterns

References

Other sources
 Interview with Steve Holt @ Onemetal.com
 http://www.thegauntlet.com/article/4/10857/36%20Crazyfists.html
 Interview @ SHOUT! Music webzine

External links

 

1994 establishments in Alaska
Metalcore musical groups from Alaska
American alternative metal musical groups
American nu metal musical groups
American post-hardcore musical groups
DRT Entertainment artists
Heavy metal musical groups from Oregon
Musical groups established in 1994
Musical quartets
Roadrunner Records artists
Articles which contain graphical timelines
Ferret Music artists